New Mexico's 2nd congressional district serves the southern half of New Mexico, including Las Cruces, Roswell, and the southern fourth of Albuquerque. Geographically, it is the fifth-largest district in the nation and the largest to not contain an entire state. It is currently represented by Democrat Gabe Vasquez.

History
Historically, the district has leaned more Republican than New Mexico's other two districts, particularly in presidential elections. In the 2020 election, Republican candidate Yvette Herrell defeated Democratic representative Xochitl Torres Small in a rematch of their race in 2018. Herrell is the third Native woman elected to Congress and she assumed office on January 3, 2021.  Following the 2020 census, each congressional district in the state underwent redistricting "to ensure that each district has a variety of constituents better reflecting the diversity of interests in New Mexico as a whole.".  This district was made much more Democratic, as it gained more of Albuquerque while losing some heavily Republican areas in the eastern part of the state. With a tight margin, Democratic challenger Gabe Vasquez won the 2022 midterm election.

Election results from statewide races
Results Under Current Lines (Since 2023)

Results Under Old Lines (2013-2023)

Results Under Old Lines (2003-2013)

List of members representing the district

Election results

1968

1970

1972

1974

1976

1978

1980

1982

1984

1986

1988

1990

1992

1994

1996

1998

2000

2002

2004

2006

2008

2010

2012

2014

2016

2018

2020

2022

See also

New Mexico's congressional districts
List of United States congressional districts

References

 Congressional Biographical Directory of the United States 1774–present

02